Annarakkannanum Thannalayathu is a 2010 Malayalam-language film directed by Prakash. Kalabhavan Mani, Suraj Venjaramood, Jayashree  and Nakshathra plays the lead roles in this film. It is produced by Kalabhavan Mani. It is a tribute to all "Kudiuyans" and Chalakkukudiuyans.

In this film Kalabhavan Mani plays a double role. Also introduced are two new heroines Nakshatra and Jayashree.

Plot 
Annarakkannanum Thannalayathu movie tells the story of Changampuzha Pavithran who is a do-gooder who hails from the land of the great poet. Pavithran is bound to be around if a soul finds itself in distress. A bachelor who dreams about meeting his lady love some day, Pavithran's life goes topsy-turvy when an astrologer predicts he will marry a widow who will transform his entire life.

Cast 
 Kalabhavan Mani as Changampuzha Pavithran
 Jayashree
 Nakshatra
 Suraj Venjaramood
 Bijukuttan
 K. P. A. C. Lalitha as Pavithran's mother
 Jagathy Sreekumar as S. Gunasekharan
 Thilakan
 Abu Salim as Eeshwaran Varma
 Indrans
 Janardhanan
 Geetha Vijayan
 Majeed 
 Ambika Mohan as Srimathi teacher

References

External links 
 
 Annarakkannanum Thannalayathu at Oneindia.in

2010 films
2010s Malayalam-language films
Indian drama films
Films shot in Thrissur
Films shot in Chalakudy
Cross-dressing in Indian films
2010 drama films